Eva Lee (born August 7, 1986) is an American badminton player.

Career 

1997
She started to play badminton and trained with her first coach Peter Baum (former US National Team member).

1998
She took her first three crown titles in US Junior National Championships.

1999

She captured her first crown title in Canadian Junior Open (under 17 Singles).

2005 World Championships
She played at the 2005 World Badminton Championships in Anaheim and lost in the first round.

2006 Intercollegiate Championships
She was both singles and doubles champion at the California Community College Athletic Association State Championships.

2006 Canadian International
In 2006 Eva Lee grabbed three titles at the Canadian Open.

2006 Boston Badminton Open
At the Boston Badminton Open she won the doubles title together with Mesinee Mangkalakiri.

2007 Pan American Games
Lee also competed in badminton at the 2007 Pan American Games in Rio de Janeiro. She won three gold medals, one in women's singles, one in women's doubles with Mesinee Mangkalakiri, and another in mixed doubles with Howard Bach.

2008 Beijing Olympics
Lee lost in the first round to Canadian Anna Rice. While losing the first game, she made a quick comeback in the second and won. In the third, she maintained lead until halfway through where Anna Rice took command and finished through.

Achievements

Pan American Games 
Women's singles

Women's doubles

Mixed doubles

Pan Am Championships 
Women's doubles

Mixed doubles

BWF Grand Prix 
The BWF Grand Prix had two levels, the Grand Prix and Grand Prix Gold. It was a series of badminton tournaments sanctioned by the Badminton World Federation (BWF) and played between 2007 and 2017.

Women's doubles

Mixed doubles

  BWF Grand Prix Gold tournament
  BWF Grand Prix tournament

BWF International Challenge/Series 
Women's singles

Women's doubles

Mixed doubles

  BWF International Challenge tournament
  BWF International Series tournament
  BWF Future Series tournament

References

External links 
 
 
 

Living people
1986 births
Sportspeople from Los Angeles County, California
American sportspeople of Chinese descent
American female badminton players
Badminton players at the 2008 Summer Olympics
Badminton players at the 2016 Summer Olympics
Olympic badminton players of the United States
Badminton players at the 2003 Pan American Games
Badminton players at the 2007 Pan American Games
Badminton players at the 2011 Pan American Games
Badminton players at the 2015 Pan American Games
Pan American Games gold medalists for the United States
Pan American Games silver medalists for the United States
Pan American Games bronze medalists for the United States
Pan American Games medalists in badminton
Medalists at the 2007 Pan American Games
Medalists at the 2011 Pan American Games
Medalists at the 2015 Pan American Games
21st-century American women